The 1948 United States presidential election in Nevada took place on November 2, 1948, as part of the 1948 United States presidential election. State voters chose three representatives, or electors, to the Electoral College, who voted for president and vice president.

Nevada was won by incumbent President Harry S. Truman (D–Missouri), running with Senator Alben W. Barkley, with 50.37% of the popular vote, against Governor Thomas Dewey (R–New York), running with Governor Earl Warren, with 47.26% of the popular vote.

Results

Results by county

See also
United States presidential elections in Nevada

References

Nevada
1948
1948 Nevada elections